Starogradska muzika (literally "old city music") is an urban traditional folk music of Bulgaria, Bosnia Hercegovina, Croatia, North Macedonia and Serbia.

In Serbia
This music was very popular during the early 1900s in Serbia. Today, this music can be heard in bohemian part of Belgrade, Skadarlija. It is most popular in the northern part of Serbia, Vojvodina. Some famous performers of this music are Zvonko Bogdan, Ksenija Cicvarić, and Toma Zdravković.

The lyrics are often romantic and depict the city life, as well as some more rural scenes.

In North Macedonia
Some of the most prominent Starogradska muzika performers are Ansambl Biljana from the city of Ohrid, which was considered an important center for this music style in the past along with Bitola, Prilep and others.

The emergence of the Starogradska music scene is related to the development of the cities and the bourgeoisie under the influences from the West in the Ottoman occupied Macedonia during the 19th century.

Unlike the rural folk which portrays the life in the villages and the nature surrounding them, the hard agricultural work in the fields etc. the Starogradska muzika lyrics are about the life in the city, its famous loves and tragedies, its famous characters (be they rich traders or poor beggars) etc. Starogradska music uses instruments such as violins and clarinets instead of rural ones such as gajda for example.  Also, while rural folk performers usually wear traditional village costumes, the starogradska music performers are usually dressed in European old city fashions (suits, hats and neckties, as well as accessories such as pocket watches, walking sticks etc.).

An important, if not the most important part of the Macedonian old city music is the musical genre called Čalgija (not to be confused with chalga, which is a contemporary Turbofolk style in Bulgaria and Serbia). In both rural and urban Macedonian folk, songs about famous revolutionaries also exist.

Other important starogradska muzika performers are: the vocal groups Oktet Makedonija from Skopje and Oktet Kumanovo from Kumanovo, the vocal and instrumental ensemble Raspeani Resenčani from Resen and others.

Audio

Macedonian songs
"Biljana platno beleše" by Ansambl Biljana, Ohrid - one of the most famous Macedonian starogradski songs
Song about the revolutionary Hristo Uzunov by Ansambl Biljana, Ohrid
Song about the girl Despina by Ansambl Biljana, Ohrid
"Jas sum moma Ohridjanka" - "Im a girl from Ohrid" by Ansambl Biljana, Ohrid

Starogradska muzika in MIDI format
MIDI files

See also
Music of North Macedonia
Music of Serbia
Music of Croatia
Folk music

Macedonian music
Serbian styles of music
Folk music genres